Eldred v. Ashcroft, 537 U.S. 186 (2003), was a decision by the Supreme Court of the United States upholding the constitutionality of the 1998 Sonny Bono Copyright Term Extension Act (CTEA). The practical result of this was to prevent a number of works from entering the public domain in 1998 and following years, as would have occurred under the Copyright Act of 1976. Materials which the plaintiffs had worked with and were ready to republish were now unavailable due to copyright restrictions.

Internet publisher Eric Eldred was the lead petitioner, and was joined by a group of commercial and non-commercial interests who relied on the public domain for their work (including Dover Publications) and many amici including the Free Software Foundation, the American Association of Law Libraries, the Bureau of National Affairs, and the College Art Association. Eldred was represented by Lawrence Lessig and a team at the Berkman Center for Internet and Society.

Supporting the law were United States Attorneys General Janet Reno and John Ashcroft, along with a set of amici including the Motion Picture Association of America, the Recording Industry Association of America, ASCAP and Broadcast Music Incorporated.

Background

The Sonny Bono Copyright Term Extension Act (or CTEA) extended existing copyright terms by an additional 20 years from the terms set by the Copyright Act of 1976. The law affected both new and existing works (making it both a prospective extension as well as a retroactive one). Specifically, for works published before January 1, 1978, and still in copyright on October 27, 1998, the term was extended to 95 years. For works authored by individuals on or after January 1, 1978 (including new works), the copyright term was extended to equal the life of the author plus 70 years. For works authored by joint authors, the copyright term was extended to the life of the last surviving author plus 70 years. In the case of works-for-hire, anonymous or pseudonymous works, the term was set at 95 years from the date of first publication, or 120 years from creation.

The practical result of this was to prevent a number of works from entering the public domain in 1998 and following years, as would have occurred under the Copyright Law of 1976. Materials which the plaintiffs had worked with and were ready to republish were now unavailable due to copyright restrictions.

The lead petitioner, Eric Eldred, is an Internet publisher. Eldred was joined by a group of commercial and non-commercial interests who relied on the public domain for their work. These included Dover Publications, a commercial publisher of paperback books; Luck's Music Library, Inc. and Edwin F. Kalmus & Co., Inc., publishers of orchestral sheet music; and many amici including the Free Software Foundation, Tri-Horn International, Boston, Mass., a golf publishing & tech co., the American Association of Law Libraries, the Bureau of National Affairs, and the College Art Association.

Supporting the law were the U.S. government, represented by the Attorney General in an ex officio capacity (originally Janet Reno, later replaced by John Ashcroft), along with a set of amici including the Motion Picture Association of America, the Recording Industry Association of America, ASCAP and Broadcast Music Incorporated.

District court
The original complaint was filed in the United States District Court for the District of Columbia on January 11, 1999. The plaintiffs' argument was threefold:

That by retroactively extending copyright terms, Congress had violated the requirements of the Constitution's Copyright Clause, which gives Congress the following power: To promote the Progress of Science and useful Arts, by securing for limited Times to Authors and Inventors the exclusive Right to their respective Writings and DiscoveriesPlaintiffs argued that by reading this formulation so as to allow for any number of retroactive extensions, Congress could in practice guarantee an unlimited period of copyright protection, thus thwarting the intent of the clause.
That any copyright law must be subject to scrutiny under the First Amendment, thereby ensuring a balance between freedom of speech and the interests of copyright.
That the doctrine of public trust requires the government to show a public benefit to any transfer of public property into private hands, and that the CTEA violates this doctrine by withdrawing material from the public domain.

In response, the government argued that Congress does indeed have the latitude to retroactively extend terms, so long as the individual extensions are also for "limited times," as required by the Constitution. As an argument for this position, they referred to the Copyright Act of 1790, the first Federal copyright legislation, which applied Federal protection to existing works. Furthermore, they argued, neither the First Amendment nor the doctrine of public trust is applicable to copyright cases.

On October 28, 1999, Judge June Green issued a brief opinion rejecting all three of the petitioners' arguments. On the first count, she wrote that Congress had the power to extend terms as it wished, as long as the terms themselves were of limited duration. On the second count, she rejected the notion of First Amendment scrutiny in copyright cases, based on her interpretation of Harper and Row Publishers, Inc., v. Nation Enterprises, an earlier Supreme Court decision. On the third count, she rejected the notion that public trust doctrine was applicable to copyright law.

Court of Appeals
The plaintiffs appealed the decision of the district court to the United States Court of Appeals for the District of Columbia Circuit, filing their initial brief on May 22, 2000, and arguing the case on October 5 of the same year in front of a three-judge panel. Arguments were similar to those made in the district court, except for those regarding the public trust doctrine, which were not included in the appeal.

Instead, the plaintiffs extended their argument on the copyright clause to note that the clause requires Congress to "promote the Progress of Science and useful Arts," and argued that retroactive extensions do not directly serve this purpose in the standard quid pro quo previously required by the courts.

The case was decided on February 16, 2001. The appeals court upheld the decision of the district court in a 2-1 opinion. In his dissent, Judge David Sentelle agreed with the plaintiffs that CTEA was indeed unconstitutional based on the "limited Times" requirement. Supreme Court precedent, he argued, held that one must be able to discern an "outer limit" to a limited power; in the case of retrospective copyright extensions, Congress could continue to extend copyright terms indefinitely through a set of limited extensions, thus rendering the "limited times" requirement meaningless.

Following this ruling, plaintiffs petitioned for a rehearing en banc (in front of the full panel of nine judges). This petition was rejected, 7–2, with Judges Sentelle and David Tatel dissenting.

Supreme Court
On October 11, 2001, the plaintiffs filed a petition for certiorari to the Supreme Court of the United States. On February 19, 2002, the Court granted certiorari, agreeing to hear the case.

Oral arguments were presented on October 9, 2002. Lead counsel for the plaintiff was Lawrence Lessig; the government's case was argued by Solicitor General Theodore Olson.

Lessig focused the Plaintiffs' brief to emphasize the Copyright clause restriction, as well as the First Amendment argument from the Appeals case. The decision to emphasize the Copyright clause argument was based on both the minority opinion of Judge Sentelle in the appeals court, and on several recent Supreme Court decisions authored by Chief Justice William Rehnquist: United States v. Lopez (1996) and United States v. Morrison (2000).

In both of those decisions, Rehnquist, along with four of the Court's more conservative justices, held Congressional legislation unconstitutional, because that legislation exceeded the limits of the Constitution's Commerce clause. This profound reversal of precedent, Lessig argued, could not be limited to only one of the enumerated powers. If the court felt that it had the power to review legislation under the Commerce clause, Lessig argued, then the Copyright clause deserved similar treatment, or at very least a "principled reason" must be stated for according such treatment to only one of the enumerated powers.

On January 15, 2003, the Court held the CTEA constitutional by a 7–2 decision. The majority opinion, written by Justice Ginsburg, relied heavily on the Copyright Acts of 1790, 1831, 1909, and 1976 as precedent for retroactive extensions. One of the arguments supporting the act was the life expectancy has significantly increased among the human population since the 18th century, and therefore copyright law needed extending as well. However, the major argument for the act that carried over into the case was that the Constitution specified that Congress only needed to set time limits for copyright, the length of which was left to their discretion. Thus, as long as the limit is not "forever," any limit set by Congress can be deemed constitutional.

A key factor in the CTEA's passage was a 1993 European Union (EU) directive instructing EU members to establish a baseline copyright term of life plus 70 years and to deny this longer term to the works of any non-EU country whose laws did not secure the same extended term. By extending the baseline United States copyright term, Congress sought to ensure that American authors would receive the same copyright protection in Europe as their European counterparts.

The Supreme Court declined to address Lessig's contention that Lopez and Morrison offered precedent for enforcing the Copyright clause, and instead reiterated the lower court's reasoning that a retroactive term extension can satisfy the "limited times" provision in the copyright clause, as long as the extension itself is limited instead of perpetual. Furthermore, the Court refused to apply the proportionality standards of the Fourteenth Amendment or the free-speech standards in the First Amendment to limit Congress's ability to confer copyrights for limited terms.

Justice Breyer dissented, arguing that the CTEA amounted to a grant of perpetual copyright that undermined public interests. While the constitution grants Congress power to extend copyright terms in order to "promote the progress of science and useful arts", CTEA granted precedent to continually renew copyright terms making them virtually perpetual. Justice Breyer argued that it is highly unlikely any artist will be more inclined to produce work knowing their great-grandchildren will receive royalties. With regard to retroactive copyright extension, he viewed it foolish to apply the government's argument that income received from royalties allows artists to produce more work saying, "How will extension help today’s Noah Webster create new works 50 years after his death?". He also attacked the idea that the fair use defense would efficiently solve the First Amendment issue, as the defense could not help "those who wish to obtain from electronic databases material that is not there", e.g. teachers searching online for material to be used in the class (and finding that the ideal material has been deleted from the database).

In a separate dissenting opinion, Justice Stevens also challenged the virtue of an individual reward, analyzing it from the perspective of patent law. He argued that the focus on compensation results only in “frustrating the legitimate members of the public who want to make use of it (a completed invention) in a free market.” Further, the compelling need to encourage creation is proportionally diminished once a work is already created. Yet while a formula pairing commercial viability to duration of protection may be said to produce more economically efficient results in respect of high technology inventions with shorter shelf-lives, the same perhaps cannot be said for certain forms of copyrighted works, for which the present value of expenditures relating to creation depend less on scientific equipment and research and development programs and more on unquantifiable creativity.

Lessig expressed surprise that no decision was authored by Chief Justice Rehnquist or by any of the other four justices who supported the Lopez or Morrison decisions. Lessig later expressed regret that he based his argument on precedent rather than attempting to demonstrate that the weakening of the public domain would cause harm to the economic health of the country.

Later developments
Within a year of Eldred, it was serving as decisive precedent. Two cases, Luck’s Music Library, Inc. v. Ashcroft and Peters and Golan v. Ashcroft and Peters, challenged the constitutionality of the Uruguay Round Agreements Act on the grounds that its "restoration amendment," which provided copyright restriction to foreign works that were in the public domain because foreign works were formerly not copyrightable, violated the First Amendment rights of those who would no longer be able to perform the works without observing copyright. The court cited Eldred and dismissed Luck's Music on the grounds that the First Amendment did not protect the ability to use others' words as much as it does protect one's ability to use their own. Golan v. Ashcroft and Peterss Uruguay Round portion survived a motion to dismiss even though its own challenge to the Sonny Bono Act did not. That case culminated in Golan v. Holder, which held that there was nothing in the Constitution preventing the government from taking works out of the public domain.

A 2007 case, Kahle v. Gonzales, worked from the Eldred v. Ashcroft opinion to argue that a change in copyright law as drastic as the change from opt-in to opt-out required a review in regard to freedom of speech. The plaintiffs, represented by Lawrence Lessig, argued that the limitations placed on speech and expression by copyright were drastically expanded and possibly too limiting. The Ninth Circuit determined that the argument was too similar to the one adjudicated in Eldred and dismissed the case.

See also
Copyright
United States copyright law
Intellectual property clause
Public Domain Enhancement Act
Free culture movement
Related cases
 Golan v. Holder (2012)
 Kahle v. Gonzales (9th Cir. 2007)

References

Further reading

External links
 
 
 Oral argument before the Supreme Court, in MP3 format (Transcript)
 Opinion of the Supreme Court, in MP3 format (Text)
 OpenLaw amicus briefs - also has other information including media coverage, etc.
  Links to various briefs filed in the case
  Symposium on Eldred from the Loyola of Los Angeles Law Review
 A timeline of U.S. Copyright
 First-person narrative of the experience of attending the Oral Argument before the Supreme Court
 Lawrence Lessig's article about why Eldred lost
 Thomas Jefferson letters relating to Copyright Clause

United States Constitution Article One case law
United States Supreme Court cases
Copyright Clause case law
United States Free Speech Clause case law
Copyright term
2003 in United States case law
Public domain in the United States
United States Supreme Court cases of the Rehnquist Court